Sphaerius is a genus of beetles in the family Sphaeriusidae, comprising 18 species. It is one of the two extant genera in the family, the other being Bezesporum. They are typically found along the edges of streams and rivers, where they feed on algae; they occur  on all continents except Antarctica. Three species occur in the United States.

The overall form of the beetle is convex, glossy, dark brown or black with some markings possible. The head is prominent, with relatively large eyes set far apart, and capitate antennae.

The beetles occur in a variety of damp environments, including mud, under stones, among plant roots and leaf litter, and in mosses in bogs. They store some air underneath their elytra.

Females produce a single large egg at a time.

The family used to be known as "Sphaeriidae", but the name was preoccupied by a family of freshwater clams. The name was inappropriately replaced with "Microsporidae" (by changing the genus name to Microsporus), but this act has been superseded by a return to the use of Sphaerius and a reformation of the family name as Sphaeriusidae. The position of the family within Coleoptera has also changed a number of times.

Species
The genus includes the following 18 species, as of 2022:
Sphaerius acaroides  – Europe
Sphaerius africanus  – South Africa
Sphaerius alticola  – Nepal
Sphaerius coomani  – Vietnam
Sphaerius gustavlohsei  – Nepal, India: Darjeeling
Sphaerius hispanicus  – France, Spain, Algeria, Tunisia
Sphaerius humicola  – Nepal
Sphaerius laeviventris  – India: Uttarakhand
Sphaerius madecassus  – Madagascar
Sphaerius obsoletus  – Vietnam
Sphaerius ovensensis  – Australia
Sphaerius perlaevis  – Vietnam
Sphaerius politus  – USA: California
Sphaerius silvicola  – Nepal
Sphaerius spississimus  – France: Corsica, Italy: Sardinia, Israel
Sphaerius tesselatus  – Vietnam
Sphaerius texanus  – USA: Texas
Sphaerius tropicus  – Guatemala

Species transferred to Bezesporum:
Sphaerius minutus  – China: Jiangxi
Sphaerius papulosus  – Myanmar

Species of unclear assignment:
Sphaerius cribratus  – Vietnam
Sphaerius favosus  – Vietnam

Species excluded from Sphaeriusidae (actually representatives of Corylophidae):
"Sphaerius" coenensis  – Australia
"Sphaerius" scutellaris  – USA

Fossil Sphaeriusidae 
 †Burmasporum Kirejtshuk 2009 Burmese amber, Myanmar, Cenomanian

References

External links
 Sphaeriusidae Tree of Life

Myxophaga genera
Taxa named by Joseph Waltl